Márta Talabér (born January 27, 1972) is a Hungarian social pedagogue and politician, member of the National Assembly (MP) for Várpalota (Veszprém County Constituency V) from 2010 to 2014. She was elected mayor of Várpalota in the 2010 local elections.

References

1972 births
Living people
Hungarian educators
Hungarian women educators
Fidesz politicians
Mayors of places in Hungary
Members of the National Assembly of Hungary (2010–2014)
Women members of the National Assembly of Hungary
People from Veszprém
21st-century Hungarian women politicians